The Airspeed AS.10 Oxford is a twin-engine monoplane aircraft developed and manufactured by Airspeed. It saw widespread use for training British Commonwealth aircrews in navigation, radio-operating, bombing and gunnery roles throughout the Second World War.

The Oxford was developed by Airspeed during the 1930s in response to a requirement for a capable trainer aircraft that conformed with Specification T.23/36, which had been issued by the British Air Ministry. Its basic design is derived from the company's earlier AS.6 Envoy, a commercial passenger aircraft. Performing its maiden flight on 19 June 1937, it was quickly put into production as part of a rapid expansion of the Royal Air Force (RAF) in anticipation of a large-scale conflict.

As a consequence of the outbreak of war, many thousands of Oxfords were ordered by Britain and its allies, including Australia, Canada, France, New Zealand, Poland, and the United States. Following the end of the conflict, the Oxford continued to achieve export sales for some time, equipping the newly formed air forces of Egypt, India, Israel, and Yugoslavia. It was considered to be a capable trainer aircraft throughout the conflict, as well as being used as a general-purpose type. A large number of Oxfords have been preserved on static display.

Development
During the 1930s, a major expansion of the Royal Air Force (RAF) had been directed by the British government, which led to the formulation and issuing of a number of operational requirements by the Air Ministry. One of these was Operational Requirement 42 (OR.42), which sought an advanced training aircraft to be specifically used by aircrews destined to serve on bomber aircraft. As the RAF was in the process of migrating from biplanes to monoplanes, which were capable of greater speeds and had more demanding flight characteristics, a suitable trainer was needed to match this step change. At one point, the Avro Anson was considered for the role, however, it was thought that an aircraft more difficult to fly would be necessary. Accordingly, on 10 July 1936, Specification T.23/36 was issued to Airspeed for the development of a twin-engined training aircraft to meet OR.42.

Developed to meet the requirements of Specification T.23/36 by Airspeed, the Oxford was based on the company's existing commercial 8-seater aircraft, the AS.6 Envoy, designed by Hessell Tiltman. Seven Envoys had already been modified for the South African Air Force (SAAF) as the "Convertible Envoy", which could be equipped at short notice with bomb racks and with a machine-gun in a hand-operated Armstrong Whitworth dorsal turret. Airspeed gained substantial benefit from its prior work on the Envoy and the Convertible Envoy in its development of the Oxford. The Air Ministry approved of the project, leading to an initial order for the type being placed during 1937.

It was decided to opt for a large first batch, totalling 136 aircraft, as this allowed for the implementation of more economical flow-line production at Airspeed's Portsmouth factory. On 19 June 1937, the first prototype Oxford, L4534, conducted its first flight at Portsmouth. Initially, two variants were planned; the Mark I, which was viewed as a general-purpose training aircraft equipped with a dorsal gun turret, and the Mark II, which lacked any turret but was instead fitted with dual controls. As further large contracts for the aircraft were placed with Airspeed, (100 Mk Is and 100 Mk IIs) it was arranged that de Havilland Aircraft would build them at Hatfield later, to meet the demands for Oxfords for training. Other companies also manufactured the aircraft.

By the end of production, a total of 8,751 Oxfords had been completed. Of these, 4,411 had been produced by Airspeed at its Portsmouth factory, another 550 at the Airspeed-run shadow factory at Christchurch, Dorset, 1,515 by de Havilland at Hatfield, 1,360 by Percival Aircraft at Luton and 750 by Standard Motors at Coventry.

Design

The Oxford was a low-wing twin-engine cantilever monoplane, featuring a semi-monocoque constructed fuselage, a conventional landing gear configuration and a wooden tail unit. It was capable of reproducing the flight characteristics of many contemporary front-line aircraft then in military service. It was specifically developed to be suitable for a range of training missions, including navigation, flying instruction, night flying, instrument flying, wireless, direction-finding, gunnery, and vertical photography. The Oxford was specifically planned and developed to incorporate various modern innovations and equipment fittings, including a full array of instruments and controls within the cockpit, which assisted in its principal trainer role. In addition, the Oxford could also be used in various secondary roles, such as an air ambulance and maritime patrol aircraft.

In terms of flying experience, the Oxford was suitably representative as to enable pilots to migrate onto larger transport aircraft with ease while possessing smooth flight characteristics. The controls were relatively straightforward, typically remaining consistent and easily adjustable; the second pilot's position is also provided with a fully furnished suite of key flight instrumentation. It was equipped with the standard blind-flying panel, incorporating an airspeed indicator, altimeter, artificial horizon, directional
gyroscope, rate of climb indicator and turn indicator. Life support equipment includes three oxygen regulators, a flowmeter, three bayonet unions and three high-pressure oxygen cylinders of 750 litres capacity. The external view of the cockpit was considered to be very high for the era, superior to the majority of its contemporaries, but is unavoidably interrupted by the engine cowlings acting as blind spots.

It was normally operated by a three-man crew; the seating arrangement could be altered in order to suit various purposes, such as to better enable a specific training role. The cockpit was outfitted with dual flying controls and a pair of seats, intended to accommodate a pilot and either a navigator or second pilot alongside. When used for bomb aimer training, the second set of controls would be removed and the freed-up space was instead used to accommodate a prone bomb-aimer. When used as a navigation trainer, the second seat was pushed back so that it would line up with the chart table. Aft of the cockpit was a wireless operator station, facing aft on the starboard side of the fuselage. On the Oxford I, a dorsal turret was located amidships; it could be used for training navigators, bomb-aimers, wireless operators, air gunners and camera operators. The centre section can contain up to 16 11 lb. practice bombs, which are controlled via bomb-release switches installed at the pilot and bomb-aimers' stations.

The Oxford was normally powered by a pair of Armstrong Siddeley Cheetah X air-cooled radial engines, capable of generating 340 hp. These were initially outfitted with wooden fixed-position de Havilland-built propellers, but had been designed from the onset to accommodate variable-pitch propellers when these became available. The starboard engine drives a hydraulic pump and air compressor, the former being used to actuate the undercarriage and flaps while the latter is used for the braking system; a vacuum pump is also present for the gyroscopic instrumentations. The port engine drives a 500-watt electrical generator. The engine cowling features an inlet that draws cooling air into a tank; a pair of tinned steel oil tanks are also contained within the cowling. Welded steel construction was used for the nacelles, which attach to the centre section of the wing at four separate rubber-insulated joints.

The retractable undercarriage of the Oxford was internally designed, featuring broken-braced twin oleo legs that retract rearward into each engine nacelle. Although actuation of the retraction mechanism is normally achieved via an engine-driven pump, a manual fall-back mechanism is provided to force the wheels down in the event of an in-flight engine failure. The undercarriage wheels are equipped with pneumatically-operated brakes, controlled by a lever set on each control column. For inspection purposes, access panels are located beneath the pilot's cockpit for internal access to the flight controls, hydraulics and electrical components; inspection panels are also present in the outer wing sections.

The semi-monocoque fuselage of Oxford uses an arrangement of spruce longerons and stiffeners underneath a plywood exterior. It is constructed in two sections on separate jigs, divided between the front and rear, these are joined together at the rear bulkhead. The forward bulkhead is deliberately reinforced so that the structure is capable of withstanding the impact of the aircraft turning over during landing in the hands of an unfortunate trainee pilot. Both the elevator and fin of the tail unit used a wooden spar and rib structure covered by fabric. The fuselage can be partially dismantled, the wing dividing into three separate sections, so that it can be road-transported. The wing uses a stressed-skin ply-covered structure using spruce flanges and ply webs. The spars are assembled upon a single jig, while others are used for the elements of the leading edge and trailing edge. Similar construction to the centre section is also used in the outer panels. The wings are outfitted with hydraulically-operated split flaps, which extend between the ailerons.

Operational history

The Oxford (nicknamed the 'Ox-box') was used to prepare complete aircrews for RAF Bomber Command and could simultaneously train pilots, navigators, bomb aimers, gunners and radio operators on the same flight. In addition to training duties, Oxfords were used in communications and anti-submarine roles and as air ambulances in the Middle East.

The Oxford was the preferred trainer for the Empire Air Training Scheme (EATS) and British Commonwealth Air Training Plan (BCATP), which sent thousands of potential aircrew to Canada for training. 27 Oxfords were on the strength of No 4 Flying Training School RAF Habbaniya, Iraq in early 1941 and some were converted locally, for use as light bombers to help in the defence of the School against Iraqi forces.

In 1941, the aviator Amy Johnson went missing in an Airspeed Oxford, presumably crashing into the Thames Estuary.

After the war, 152 surplus Oxfords were converted into 6-seat commercial airliners called the AS.65 Consul. A few Oxfords were acquired by the Hellenic Air Force and used by the 335th Squadron during the Greek Civil War.

Although the Oxford was equipped with fixed-pitch wooden or Fairey-Reed metal propellers, the cockpit contained a propeller pitch lever, which had to be moved from "Coarse" to "Fine" for landing. This was to reinforce this important step for trainee pilots.

Oxfords continued to serve the Royal Air Force as trainers and light transports until the last was withdrawn from service in 1956. Some were sold for use by overseas air arms, including the Royal Belgian Air Force.
Most Oxfords in the UK were equipped with a knotted rope from the pilot's seat to the rear door to assist evacuation should the plane inadvertently be put into a spin, which it was almost impossible to recover from. When the pilot(s) released their seat belts centripetal force would hurl them to the rear of the plane, beyond the exit door, from which it was impossible to crawl forward to the door. The rope was installed as a response to a test by four "boffins" who tried to recover from a spin from 18,000 ft. When no recovery happened no matter what was tried the four released their harness and were hurled to the rear of their plane and there remained helpless as the spiral descent continued.  However all was not lost. The plane was in such a flat spin when it reached the ground that it skidded sideways over the surface of a field until the tail section hit a haystack and broke off.  The four "boffins" walked away relatively unharmed, the knotted rope being their only positive remedy for an Oxford in a spin.

Australia
From November 1940, the Royal Australian Air Force received 391 Oxford I and IIs from RAF contracts for use in Australia. Most of the survivors were sold in the early 1950s.

Canada
The Royal Canadian Air Force ordered 25 Oxford Is in 1938. They were taken from RAF stocks and shipped to Canada in 1939 and assembled by Canadian Vickers at Montreal. Issued to the Central Flying School, they were later joined by large numbers of RAF aircraft to equip the Service Flying Training Schools.
819 Oxfords of all Marks were operated by the RCAF in Canada for the BCATP during the war.

New Zealand
New Zealand was one of the first nations to order the Oxford in 1937 with a contract for five Oxford Is; the fifth aircraft was modified as a survey aircraft. They were delivered to New Zealand by sea and assembled at RNZAF Hobsonville at the end of 1938. The RNZAF placed further orders for six and then 30 Oxfords. With the start of the Commonwealth Air Training Plan a further 140 aircraft were allocated, which included the last batch of 30 ordered. In total, the RNZAF operated 299 Oxfords between 1938 and 1952.

South Africa
As part of the Commonwealth Air Training Plan, the South African Air Force was allocated nearly 700 Oxfords which started to arrive in South Africa from November 1940. Due to the intense training, 256 aircraft were lost to accidents. Most survivors were withdrawn in 1945 and had been sold by 1947.

United States
The United States Army Air Forces (USAAF) used 137 Oxfords on loan from the Royal Air Force. Most were used as general-purpose communications aircraft in the United Kingdom; from June 1942 they were also used for Beam Approach training. By the end of 1944, American types were available, and all USAAF Oxfords had been returned to the RAF. A small number had also been loaned to the USAAF in Australia by the Royal Australian Air Force. Two Oxfords were used by the United States Navy in the United Kingdom as communications aircraft.

Other users

Belgium
 When the Belgian section of the Royal Air Force returned to Belgian control as the Militaire Vliegwezen (became the Belgian Air Force in 1949), the RAF donated thirty Oxfords to form a flying training school. They were used until the late 1950s with the last aircraft being donated to the Brussels War Museum in 1960.
Belgian Congo
In April 1944 six Oxfords were transferred to the Force Publique in the Belgian Congo, they were withdrawn from use in 1955.
Burma
 At least 15 Oxfords along with some Consuls were supplied to the Union of Burma Air Force in the late 1940s with some being modified to carry pod-mounted forward facing machine guns and rocket projectiles.
Ceylon
 Three former RAF Oxfords were delivered to the Royal Ceylon Air Force in 1953.
Czechoslovakia
 It is reported that some Oxfords were given the type code D42 and were used for bombing training.
Denmark
 From the end of 1946 the Danish Air Force received 44 former RAF Oxfords for advanced flying training at Karup, they were also used for communications and aerial photography, all were withdrawn by 1956.
Egypt
 RAF Oxfords where loaned to the Royal Egyptian Air Force but at least one was transferred in 1948.
France
 The Free French Air Force in West Africa received five new Oxfords in 1944 and were used until 1946.
Greece
 The Royal Hellenic Air Force received at least 33 Oxfords in 1947 for transport and aerial photography.
India
 When India became independent in December 1947 nine Oxfords were transferred to the Royal Indian Air Force, later Indian Air Force from December 1949.
Iran
 Three Oxfords were delivered to the Imperial Iranian Air Force.
Israel
 Three Oxfords and eleven Consuls were used by the Central Flying School of the Israeli Defence Force Air Force for twin-engined training in the early 1950s.
Netherlands
 From May 1946 the Royal Netherlands Air Force received 28 Oxfords for aircrew training, they had been withdrawn from use by 1952.
 In October 1947 the Royal Netherlands Navy received three Oxfords for multi-engined and navigation training from Valkenburg, two former Royal Netherlands Air Force aircraft were added in 1951, all were withdrawn by 1952.
Norway
 The Royal Norwegian Air Force bought twenty surplus Oxfords from the RAF in 1947.
Portugal
 The Portuguese Army and Navy each received six Oxfords in 1943 under Operation Oatmeal, by the time the Portuguese Air Force was formed in 1952 four aircraft were still in service.
Turkey
 The Turkish Air Force were supplied with 50 Oxford I's in 1943 and these were joined by twenty more between 1946 and 1947. They were replaced by the AT-11 in the early 1950s and the survivors were scrapped.
Yugoslavia
 Five Oxfords were supplied to the Yugoslav Air Force between 1951 and 1958 by Norway under the Mutual Defence Aid Program and used for twin-engined training of Mosquito crews.

Variants
AS.10 Oxford I
The first Mark I flew on 19 June 1937 and entered service with the Central Flying School in November of that year.  By the start of the war, about 300 Mk I Oxfords were in service with the RAF, while a number were also being used by the Royal New Zealand Air Force to train pilots for the RAF.
AS.10 Oxford II
The second planned version was the Oxford II, it didn't have a turret but had dual controls so it could be used as an advanced pilot trainier as well as training for navigators and radio operators. At the start of the second world war 70 were in service.
AS.10 Oxford III
Powered by two Cheetah XV engines with 425 hp (315 kW) and Rotol constant-speed propellers, used for navigation and radio training.
AS.10 Oxford IV
Flying test-bed for de Havilland Gipsy Queen IV engines.
Oxford T.II
Only 9 of these were built, eight of them being conversions of Mk Is.
AS.40 Oxford
Civil conversion for radio research, two built.
AS.41 Oxford
Used by Miles Aircraft as a flying test-bed for Alvis Leonides engine, one conversion.
AS.42 Oxford
Oxford I to meet Specification T.39/37 for New Zealand.
AS.43 Oxford
Survey variant of the AS.42
AS.46 Oxford V
The final variant, upgraded to Pratt & Whitney R-985 radial engines with 450 hp (335 kW) and Hamilton-Standard variable-pitch propellers. Many Mark I and II Oxfords were upgraded to the Mark V standard.
AS.65 Consul
After the end of WWII, over 150 aircraft surplus ex-RAF Oxfords were converted for civilian transport operation; this type was known as the Airspeed Consul.

Operators

 Royal Australian Air Force

 Belgian Air Force

 Force Publique

 Union of Burma Air Force

 Royal Ceylon Air Force

 Royal Canadian Air Force

 Czechoslovakian Air Force – One aircraft, in service from 1945 to 1948

 Royal Danish Air Force

 Royal Egyptian Air Force

 Free French Air Force

 Royal Hellenic Air Force

 Indian Air Force

 Imperial Iranian Air Force

 Israeli Air Force

 Royal Netherlands Air Force
 Dutch Naval Aviation Service

 Royal New Zealand Air Force
 No. 1 Squadron RNZAF
 No. 2 Squadron RNZAF
 No. 3 Squadron RNZAF
 No. 7 Squadron RNZAF
 No. 8 Squadron RNZAF
 No. 14 Squadron RNZAF
 No. 42 Squadron RNZAF

 Royal Norwegian Air Force

 Polish Air Force in Great Britain

 Portuguese Air Force
 Portuguese Army
 Portuguese Navy

 South African Air Force

 Turkish Air Force

 Royal Air Force
 No. 1 Squadron RAF
 No. 5 Squadron RAF
 No. 17 Squadron RAF
 No. 20 Squadron RAF
 No. 24 Squadron RAF
 No. 34 Squadron RAF
 No. 41 Squadron RAF
 No. 116 Squadron RAF
 No. 173 Squadron RAF
 No. 192 Squadron RAF
 No. 285 Squadron RAF
 No. 286 Squadron RAF
 No. 287 Squadron RAF
 No. 288 Squadron RAF
 No. 289 Squadron RAF
 No. 290 Squadron RAF
 No. 510 Squadron RAF
 No. 526 Squadron RAF
 No. 527 Squadron RAF
 No. 529 Squadron RAF
 No. 567 Squadron RAF
 No. 577 Squadron RAF
 No. 587 Squadron RAF
 No. 595 Squadron RAF
 No. 598 Squadron RAF
 No. 631 Squadron RAF
 No. 667 Squadron RAF
 No. 691 Squadron RAF
 No. 695 Squadron RAF
 Fleet Air Arm
 700 Naval Air Squadron
 701 Naval Air Squadron
 702 Naval Air Squadron
 703 Naval Air Squadron
 720 Naval Air Squadron
 727 Naval Air Squadron
 728 Naval Air Squadron
 729 Naval Air Squadron
 730 Naval Air Squadron
 739 Naval Air Squadron
 740 Naval Air Squadron
 744 Naval Air Squadron
 750 Naval Air Squadron
 751 Naval Air Squadron
 758 Naval Air Squadron
 759 Naval Air Squadron
 760 Naval Air Squadron
 761 Naval Air Squadron
 762 Naval Air Squadron
 765 Naval Air Squadron
 766 Naval Air Squadron
 771 Naval Air Squadron
 775 Naval Air Squadron
 776 Naval Air Squadron
 780 Naval Air Squadron
 781 Naval Air Squadron
 782 Naval Air Squadron
 787 Naval Air Squadron
 789 Naval Air Squadron
 790 Naval Air Squadron
 792 Naval Air Squadron
 798 Naval Air Squadron
 799 Naval Air Squadron
 1701 Naval Air Squadron

 United States Army Air Forces
 United States Navy

 SFR Yugoslav Air Force

Surviving aircraft

Belgium
 016/MP455 – Oxford I on static display at the Royal Museum of the Armed Forces and Military History in Brussels.

Canada
 Replica – Unknown with Frank Thompson of Reidland, Saskatchewan. It was rebuilt to static display condition by volunteers from the Saskatchewan Western Development Museum in Moose Jaw, Saskatchewan.

New Zealand
 PK286 – Oxford I on static display at the Air Force Museum of New Zealand in Wigram, Canterbury. It had been converted to Airspeed Consul configuration in 1947. It is on long-term loan from the Canada Aviation and Space Museum. The aircraft went on display in February 2016.
 NZ277 – Oxford I wreckage on display at the Taranaki Aviation Transport and Technology Museum near New Plymouth, Taranaki. The aircraft crashed in October 1942. The wreckage was discovered 32 years later by NZ Forester Service hunter Errol Clince in 1974.
 NZ1332 – Oxford II under restoration by Don Subritzky in Dairy Flat, Auckland.
 R6029 – Unknown on display at the Croydon Aircraft Company in Mandeville, Southland. It is configured as Consul VR-SCD.

South Africa
 ED290 – Oxford I under restoration to static display at the South African Air Force Museum in Port Elizabeth, Eastern Cape.

United Kingdom
 MP425 – Oxford I on static display at the Royal Air Force Museum London in London.
 V3388 – Oxford I on static display at the Imperial War Museum in Duxford, Cambridgeshire.
 AT605 – Oxford I wreck under rebuild with the Midland Aircraft Recovery Group.
 EB518 – Oxford V Restoration At Lytham St Anne’s Spitfire Centre Blackpool Airport.

Specifications (Mk I)

See also

Notes

References

Citations

Bibliography
 
 Bridgman, Leonard. Jane's Fighting Aircraft of World War II. New York: Crescent Books, 1988. .
 Flintham, V. (1990). Air Wars and Aircraft: a detailed record of air combat, 1945 to the present. London : Arms and Armour. .
 Fredriksen, John C. International Warbirds: An Illustrated Guide to World Military Aircraft, 1914–2000. ABC-CLIO, 2001. .
 Gunston, Bill. Classic World War II Aircraft Cutaways. London: Osprey, 1995. .
 Hamlin, John F. The Oxford, Consul & Envoy File. Tunbridge Wells, Kent, UK: Air-Britain (Historians) Ltd., 2001. .
 
 Middleton, Don. "RAF Piston Trainers No 9 Airspeed Oxford–Part One". Aeroplane Monthly, May 1980, Volume 9 No 5, ISSN 0143-7240. pp. 242–249.
 Middleton, Don. "RAF Piston Trainers No 9 Airspeed Oxford–Part Two". Aeroplane Monthly, June 1980, Volume 9 No 6, ISSN 0143-7240. pp. 322–327.

 Pacco, John. "Airspeed Oxford Mk.I" Belgisch Leger/Armee Belge: Het militair Vliegwezen/l'Aeronautique militaire 1930–1940. Artselaar, Belgium, 2003, p. 89. .
 Rawlings, John D.R. "The Airspeed Oxford". Aircraft in Profile, Volume 11. Windsor, Berkshire, UK: Profile Publications Ltd., 1971.
 Taylor, H. A. Airspeed Aircraft since 1931. London: Putnam, 1970. .
 Thetford, Owen. Aircraft of the Royal Air Force 1918–57. London: Putnam, 1957.
 Wilson, Stewart. Aircraft of WWII. Fyshwick, ACT, Australia: Aerospace Publications Pty Ltd., 1998. .
.

External links

 Fleet Air Arm Archive
 "Singles to Twins" 1943 article on using Oxford for training

Oxford
1930s British military trainer aircraft
Low-wing aircraft
Aircraft first flown in 1937
Twin piston-engined tractor aircraft